Eriophyes is a genus of acari that forms galls, specially on trees of the family Rosaceae. Some are called blister mites. The blue butterfly Celastrina serotina has been reported to feed on these galls and also on the mites, making it one of the uncommon carnivorous Lepidoptera.

Species
Species include:

 Eriophyes alniincanae Nalepa, 1919
 Eriophyes amelancheus Nalepa, 1926
 Eriophyes arianus (Canestrini 1890)
 Eriophyes betulae 
 Eriophyes betulinus 
 Eriophyes bucidae 
 Eriophyes buxi 
 Eriophyes calcercis , purple erineum maple mite
 Eriophyes calophylli 
 Eriophyes calycophthirus 
 Eriophyes canestrini 
 Eriophyes canestrinii 
 Eriophyes cerasicrumena , black cherry finger gall mite
 Eriophyes chondrillae 
 Eriophyes condrillae , gall mites
 Eriophyes crataegi 
 Eriophyes cupulariae 
 Eriophyes dentatae 
 Eriophyes dimocarpi , longan gall mite
 Eriophyes diversipunctatus 
 Eriophyes emarginatae 
 Eriophyes epimedii 
 Eriophyes euphorbiae 
 Eriophyes exilis 
 Eriophyes genistae 
 Eriophyes goniothorax 
 Eriophyes gossypii , cotton blister mite
 Eriophyes guerreronis 
 Eriophyes inangulis 
 Eriophyes kuko 
 Eriophyes laevis 
 Eriophyes lateannulatus 
 Eriophyes leiosoma (Nalepa, 1892)
 Eriophyes lentiginosus 
 Eriophyes litchii , lychee erinose mite or litchi rust mite
 Eriophyes macrorhynchus (Nalepa, 1889), sycamore gall mite
 Eriophyes mali , appleleaf Blistergalls
 Eriophyes melaleucae 
 Eriophyes menthae 
 Eriophyes neoessegi , cottonwood catkingall mite
 Eriophyes oxycedri 
 Eriophyes padi 
 Eriophyes parapopuli , poplar budgall mite
 Eriophyes parulmi , elm fingergall mite
 Eriophyes pilifex 
 Eriophyes populi , eriophyid mite
 Eriophyes propinquus 
 Eriophyes prunispinosae 
 Eriophyes pseudoinsidiosus 
 Eriophyes pyri , pearleaf blister mite
 Eriophyes rubicolens 
 Eriophyes similis 
 Eriophyes sorbi 
 Eriophyes tiliae (Pagenstecher 1857), eriophyid mite
 Eriophyes triradiatus , eriophyid mite
 Eriophyes tristriatus 
 Eriophyes tulipae , wheat curl mite
 Eriophyes viburni 
 Eriophyes vitis 
 Eriophyes von

References

Eriophyidae
Trombidiformes genera
Galls